Proof of Fermat's last theorem may refer to:
 Wiles's proof of Fermat's Last Theorem
 Proof of Fermat's Last Theorem for specific exponents

Fermat's Last Theorem